Nelson United was a New Zealand soccer club, based in the South Island city of Nelson. Their home ground was Guppy Park. 

The team was founded in 1968 through the amalgamation of Nelson Thistle (founded 1924) and Nelson Rangers (founded 1950 as Settlers, name changed in 1959). Nelson United has since merged with Nelson Metro, Nelson City and Tahuna to form FC Nelson.

United played in the old New Zealand National Soccer League's top flight 1976–80, 1983–88, and 1991–92. They were winners of the 1977 Chatham Cup, and were finalists in 1978. Nelson Rangers had previously reached the semi-finals in 1962 and 1964.

References

Association football clubs in New Zealand
Sport in Nelson, New Zealand
1968 establishments in New Zealand
Association football clubs established in 1968